The Golden Sabre is a 1981 novel written by Australian author Jon Cleary.

During the Russian Revolution of 1917, an American mining engineer and English governess flee across country.

References

External links
The Golden Sabre at AustLit (subscription required)

1981 Australian novels
Novels set in the Russian Revolution
William Collins, Sons books
William Morrow and Company books
Novels by Jon Cleary